The Hacking River is a watercourse that is located in the Southern Sydney region of New South Wales in Australia. For thousands of years traditional owners called the river Deeban, however the colonial settlers renamed the river after Henry Hacking, a British seaman who killed Pemulwuy and was a pilot at Port Jackson in colonial New South Wales.

Course
Drawing its source from the east north-eastern runoff of the Illawarra escarpment, drained via Kellys Creek and Gills Creek, both terminating in falls adjacent to each other. The waters of both creeks combine in the valley below, forming the Hacking River. The river descends  over its  course. Although the Illawarra escarpment has a substantial rainfall, in dry periods, the river can be reduced to a mere trickle, resulting in connected puddles rather than a constant flow.

Most of the river flows through the Garawarra State Conservation Park and the Royal National Park. However, at its upper reaches it has been subject to the impacts of urbanisation (Helensburgh and Otford), rural activities, and a large coal mine. The construction of the Princes Highway and the Sydney to Wollongong railway each have had impacts on the river. Many parts of what is now Royal National Park had been subjected to one form or another of exploitation, with consequential impacts on the river. Other impacts over time have been leachates from the Helensburgh tip, the Garrawarra Hospital sewage, and the construction of obstructions across the river.

Ecology
Its upper reaches lie adjacent to the Garawarra State Conservation Area, where it is a narrow stream in a gully within rainforest. The river passes through a variety of plant communities, such as dry eucalyptus forest, tall wet eucalyptus forest and rainforests. Significant rainforest plants growing by the river banks include white beech, citronella, supplejack, Bangalow palm, jackwood and golden sassafras. The blackbutt, grey ironbark and bangalay are common eucalyptus trees. As it moves downstream, it flattens and widens before it reaches the estuary at Port Hacking.

A variety of molluscs, crustaceans, insects, fish and birds live in and around the river. Long finned eels migrate from oceanic spawning grounds as elvers. As adults they mature in the creeks and streams of the Royal National Park, sometimes to be seen in the river pools. Jollytail are common small fish. Platypus may occasionally be seen in the river, and azure kingfishers nest in the river banks. The land snail Meridolum marshalli is restricted to Royal National Park; its main habitat is wet areas near the river.

History and human development

Aboriginal history

For more than  years prior to 1840, the Tharawal (or Dharwal) people occupied the catchment area evidenced by hundreds of Aboriginal artefacts, middens, rock carvings and cave paintings. In the mid-19th century shell grit was in high demand as a source of lime for building in the Sydney district. Consequently, mud and oyster rocks were collected in large numbers from Port Hacking catchment destroying a number of aboriginal midden sites in the region.

The Gweagal people lived mainly by the saltwater bays and estuaries of Port Hacking, they also used the freshwater resources of the upper Hacking River, Heathcote Creek and the Woronora River. The Gweagal people were said to be the guardians of the sacred white clay pits on their territorial land, now known as the Kurnell Peninsula. They used the clay to make body paint, medicine and when mixed with local berries it was also used as a dietary supplement.

European history
The river is crossed by four causeways at and near the village of Otford near its headwaters. At Otford below the railway station is a small dam, constructed for the supply of water for steam locomotives. A causeway is incorporated as part of the structure, which results in a substantial pond upstream. Other significant structures are the Upper Crossing (below Waterfall and above the confluence with Waterfall Creek) and at Audley. The causeway, built in 1899,  at Audley within the Royal National Park. Here, mangrove flats were cleared to make way for boat-sheds and accommodation in the late 19th century. A boatshed and picnic grounds remain at Audley, having been used continuously since. Visitors can canoe and kayak further upstream along the Hacking River or its tributary Kangaroo Creek.

The soft soils are vulnerable to erosion, which is exacerbated by bushwalking. Erosion is facilitated by relatively high rainfall in the Garrawarra State Conservation Area. Furthermore, runoff from the towns of Helensburgh, Otford and Stanwell Tops (which lie above the catchment) has also impacted on water quality in the river, resulting in increased turbidity and algal growth.

A consequence of the weir was to divide the river into freshwater/saltwater tidal components. Impacts were to impede fish migration and to cause the accretion of sediment behind the weir. In flood, the road across the causeway is impassable, thus isolating the villages of Bundeena and Maianbar. As the Upper Causeway would also flood in these conditions, an all-weather bridge was built at the Upper Causeway.

The tide reaches the weir, and although there is some lag, there is virtually no tidal prism.  From the weir, the river continues downstream in the main through the Royal National Park, although towards its fluvial delta at Grays Point, it flows on one side through the suburbs of Kirrawee and Grays Point. It is opposite  Grays Point that Muddy Creek joins the River. From this point downstream the river is characterised by large stands of mangroves and an extensive fluvial delta. Historically, the fluvial sediments below the weir have been restrictive to navigation. After the declaration of the national park, the trustees were concerned to facilitate boat access to the new park and consequently training walls were built. Subsequently, as navigation increased, there was repeated pressure for dredging. The fluvial delta has not been dredged for many years. Nonetheless, there is a well-used boating facility at Swallow Rock (Grays Point).

See also

 List of rivers of Australia
 List of rivers of New South Wales (A-K)
 Rivers of New South Wales
 Guide to Sydney Rivers site

References

External links
 

Rivers of Sydney
Audley, New South Wales